ACG Sunderland is a private school and is part of ACG Education (formerly known as Academic Colleges Group). It is located in Henderson, a western suburb of Auckland.

History
The Sunderland Education Trust founded Sunderland in 2007 as "Sunderland School and College". It was the first private secondary school to open in Waitakere City (modern West Auckland), opening at the former site of the Waitakere City Council buildings. In 2010, Academic Colleges Group (ACG) took over the management contract for Sunderland, changing the name to ACG Sunderland.

Student body
ACG Sunderland provides education to boys and girls from Years 1 to 13, as well as a preschool. The student body is split into six houses, named after four founders of the school and two places in Auckland: Waitakere, Whenuapai, Tong, Fleming, Findlay, and McDonald.

Curriculum
ACG Sunderland offers the University of Cambridge International Examinations (CIE) and is a member of the Association of Cambridge Schools in New Zealand. Subjects include English, Music, Mathematics, Co-ordinated Science, Physics, Chemistry, Biology, History, Art, Computer Science, Geography and Physical Education. ICT is integrated. There is a Spanish teaching room and rooms for learning support, ESOL, College art and Primary School art.

Campus
ACG Sunderland's campus comprises architecturally designed premises and nine acres of landscaped grounds. As well as providing a full-sized gymnasium, computer suites, science laboratories, art rooms and a specialist technology department, the School places emphasis on the performing arts, with specialist music rooms, a band practice room, a drama room and a 150-seat auditorium.

References

Primary schools in Auckland
Secondary schools in Auckland
Private schools in New Zealand
Cambridge schools in New Zealand
Educational institutions established in 2007
2007 establishments in New Zealand
Schools in West Auckland, New Zealand